Adjunct Audio is an electronic music record label based in Los Angeles, California. It was founded in 2005 by Kenneth James Gibson AKA  [a]pendics.shuffle and Konstantin Gabbro and is distributed by Kompakt. Adjunct releases a range of styles from Deep House and Minimal Techno to Dub and Ambient. Producers such as John Tejada, Bruno Pronsato, Dapayk, Blakkat, Kit Clayton, Mathias Schaffhäuser, DubLoner, Sutekh, Dilo, Mikael Stavostrand, Mr. C, and  [a]pendics.shuffle himself have worked with the label.

References

External links
Official Adjunct website
Discogs: Adjunct
Discogs: Adjunct Digital
Resident Advisor: Adjunct

Electronic music record labels
Techno record labels
Record labels established in 2005